L'Amour fou is a 1969 French film directed by Jacques Rivette, who also co-wrote the script with Marilù Parolini.

Plot
L'Amour fou follows the dissolution of the marriage between Claire, an actress (played by Bulle Ogier), and Sebastien, her director (Jean-Pierre Kalfon). It is black and white with two different film gauges (35 mm and 16 mm) employed at different times throughout the film. The film focuses on a long cycle of self-destruction in Claire and Sebastien's relationship.

The central event in the film's narrative is a three-week period of preparation by a theater group for a production of Racine's version of Andromaque.  A crew films the preparations of the theater company in handheld 16 mm, while the rest of the film is shot in 35 mm.  This framework allows Rivette to focus on the act of direction, in the formation of an artwork and the dissolution of a relationship.

Significance
The film is pivotal in Rivette's career as a precursor to his vast 12+ hour opus Out 1 which followed two years later.

Cast
 Bulle Ogier - Claire
 Jean-Pierre Kalfon - Sébastien-Pyrrhus
 André S. Labarthe - Le réalisateur
 Josée Destoop - Marta-Hermione
 Dennis Berry - Dennis-Pylade
 Michèle Moretti - Michèle

Further reading

References

External links
 
 
 

French avant-garde and experimental films
1969 films
1969 drama films
1960s French-language films
Films directed by Jacques Rivette
Jean Racine
1960s avant-garde and experimental films
French drama films
1960s French films